Nodaway Township is one of twelve townships in Adams County, Iowa, USA.  At the 2010 census, its population was 235.

Geography
According to the USGS, it contains three cemeteries: Baldwin, Methodist Grove and Nodaway.

References

External links
 US-Counties.com
 City-Data.com

Townships in Adams County, Iowa
Townships in Iowa